Raki may refer to:

Liquors
 Raki / Rakia (with a dotted "i"), fruit-based spirits in several countries in southeast Europe
 Rakı (with a dotless "ı"), an anise-flavored spirit popular in Turkey, similar to ouzo

Fictional and mythological entities
Raki, a character in the manga/anime series Claymore
Raki, an alternative name for Rangi, the Sky Father in the South Island dialect of Māori

See also
 Rakhi (disambiguation)
 Rakia, a fruit brandy popular in the Balkans
 Reiki (era), an era of Japanese history
 Reiki, a type of energy therapy

tr:Rakı